Ololygon albicans, commonly known as the Teresopolis snouted treefrog,  is a species of frog in the family Hylidae endemic to Brazil. Its natural habitats are subtropical or tropical moist lowland forests, subtropical or tropical moist montane forests, and rivers. It is threatened by habitat loss.

References

albicans
Endemic fauna of Brazil
Amphibians described in 1967
Taxonomy articles created by Polbot